Urszula Radwańska (born 7 December 1990) is a Polish professional tennis player.

Radwańska has won one doubles title on the WTA Tour, as well as seven singles and ten doubles titles on the ITF Women's Circuit. On 8 October 2012, she reached her career-high singles ranking of world No. 29. On 21 September 2009, she peaked at No. 74 in the doubles rankings. As a junior player, Radwańska won the 2007 Wimbledon girls' singles title, culminating in the junior year-ending world No. 1 ranking.

Nicknamed Ula, she is the younger sister of Agnieszka Radwańska.

Tennis career
As a junior player, Radwańska won Grand Slam titles, including the 2007 Wimbledon girls' singles, culminating in the junior year-ending world No. 1 ranking. This was the launching pad into her professional career, where she has been getting into WTA main draws via qualifying and wildcards.

In 2007, Radwańska played in the main draw of three WTA Tour tournaments. She lost in the first round of the Tier II Warsaw Open in Warsaw, the second round of the Tier III Japan Open in Tokyo, and the quarterfinals of the Tier III Bangkok Open after defeating fourth-seeded Virginie Razzano in the third round. Urszula and Agnieszka won a doubles title together at the İstanbul Cup.

At the 2008 Wimbledon Championships, Radwańska made her Grand Slam singles debut, losing in the second round to two-time champion Serena Williams 4–6, 4–6. Having seen the fight she put up in this match, the commentator Andrew Castle observed: "She is sound in just about all areas, and she knows what to do with the ball, she seems to have an understanding, a little like Martina Hingis."

2009: Breaking into the top 100

On 16 February 2009, the Radwańska sisters played their first official tour match against each other in the first round of the Dubai Tennis Championships. Urszula won the match in straight sets 6–4, 6–3 hitting six aces and 25 winners.

At the Indian Wells Open, she defeated sixth-seeded Svetlana Kuznetsova in three sets, the highest ranked player she had ever defeated. She then lost to ninth-seeded Caroline Wozniacki in her first ever WTA fourth-round match. Her results at this tournament caused her singles ranking to break into the top 100 for the first time.

In the second Grand Slam tournament of the year, the French Open, Radwańska lost in the first round to Yanina Wickmayer. She advanced to the second round of the Wimbledon Championships, falling to No. 14, Dominika Cibulková. She then competed in the US Open, losing to Kristina Barrois in the opening round.

2010–2011: First WTA semifinal
Radwańska lost in the first round of 2010 Australian Open to eventual champion Serena Williams. She was then forced to take a break to undergo lumbar spine surgery in Miami, Florida. Following a six-month break, she returned to action in August. At the US Open, she scored her first main-draw win of the year by defeating Anna Chakvetadze, but lost her next round to Lourdes Domínguez Lino.

Radwańska then lost in the qualifying draw of the 2011 Australian Open. She advanced to the third round at Indian Wells, before falling to Victoria Azarenka. However, she was unable to qualify for the French Open or the Wimbledon Championships. Subsequently, she won three qualifying matches at the US Open to make the main draw before she lost to her sister Agnieszka in the first round. She reached her first WTA Tour semifinal at the Tashkent Open, eventually losing to top seed Ksenia Pervak.

2012: Breaking into the top 30
Radwańska began her season at the Sydney International. She qualified for the main draw defeating wildcard Sally Peers, eighth seed Iveta Benešová, and 13th seed Vania King. In the first round, she lost to her sister and seventh seed Agnieszka 1–6, 1–6. Ranked 99 at the Australian Open, Radwańska defeated qualifier Alison Riske in the first round before losing to Sorana Cîrstea 6–1, 2–6, 3–6. She reached the second round of the French Open, losing to fourth seed Petra Kvitová. Radwańska started the grass-court season playing the $75k tournament in Nottingham. She saved three match points in her opening round against Misaki Doi and went on to win the title. Weather forced the semifinals and final to be played on the same day. Radwańska won both matches in three sets, defeating Irina Falconi in and CoCo Vandeweghe. This result granted her qualification into the main draw for the London Olympics. She reached her first career final at the Rosmalen Open where she lost to Nadia Petrova.

At Wimbledon, Radwańska lost her first round to Marina Erakovic. She teamed up with her sister in doubles; they advanced to the third round before withdrawing due to Agnieszka's illness.

She started out the summer hard-court season at the Silicon Valley Classic and Southern California Open where she reached the quarterfinals of both events.
In London Olympics, she lost to eventual champion Serena Williams (2–6, 3–6). Partnering with her sister in doubles, she lost in the second round to the top seeded team Liezel Huber/Lisa Raymond.

Returning to hard courts, she qualified for the main draw at Rogers Cup and Western & Southern Open where she lost to Ekaterina Makarova and Serena Williams respectively. At the US Open she lost in the first round to 20th seed Roberta Vinci, who subsequently eliminated her older sister in the fourth round.

She reached back-to-back semifinal at the Tashkent Open and Guangzhou International Open but fell to Irina-Camelia Begu and Hsieh Su-wei, respectively. Both went on to win the title. At the Pan Pacific Open, she defeated Ana Ivanovic in the second round but lost to Angelique Kerber in the third. She lost in the first round of the China Open to Romina Oprandi, and defeated Francesca Schiavone at the first round of the Kremlin Cup. Her season ended with a loss to Caroline Wozniacki in round two. Urszula finished the season with a 47–29 record.

2013: Fed Cup success

Urszula began the season at the Brisbane International. She scored a three-set win over Tamira Paszek in the first round. She then lost in the second round to qualifier Ksenia Pervak. Urszula played her final tournament before the Australian Open at the Sydney International. She was defeated in the first round by seventh seed Caroline Wozniacki. Urszula was seeded for the first time of her career at a Grand Slam event at the Australian Open. However, she fell in the first round to Jamie Hampton.

After the Australian Open, Urszula competed at the Open GdF Suez. She lost in the first round to eventual champion Mona Barthel. Urszula won her first tour match of 2013 at the Qatar Open defeating Nadiia Kichenok in the first round. She then upset 15th seed Roberta Vinci in the second round. Her run ended as she lost in the third round to second seed, Serena Williams. Urszula qualified for the Dubai Championships beating Yuliya Beygelzimer, Akgul Amanmuradova, and Kurumi Nara. She lost in the first round of the main draw to Zheng Jie. In March, Urszula played at the Indian Wells Open where she beat Arantxa Rus in her first-round match. In the second round, she upset 15th seed Sloane Stephens. In the third round, she got the victory over Jamie Hampton. In the fourth round, she lost to top seed and defending champion, Victoria Azarenka. After Indian Wells, Urszula played at the Miami Open where she won her first-round match over Annika Beck. She then lost to 12th seed Ana Ivanovic in the second round. Seeded seventh at the Monterrey Open, Urszula lost in the quarterfinals to third seed Maria Kirilenko.

Urszula began her clay-court season at the Portugal Open. She upset second seed Dominika Cibulková in her first-round match. In the second round, she lost to Ayumi Morita. At the Madrid Open, Urszula was defeated in the first round by seventh seed Sara Errani. Her final tournament before Roland Garros was the Italian Open. In the first round, she upset 15th seed Ana Ivanovic. She then fell in the second round to Ayumi Morita. Ranked 40 at the French Open, Urszula stunned 30th seed and seven time Grand Slam winner Venus Williams in the first round. She lost in the second round to qualifier Dinah Pfizenmaier.

Urszula began her grass-court season at the Birmingham Classic. Seeded eighth and receiving a first-round bye, she was defeated in the second round by eventual finalist Donna Vekić. Seeded seventh at the Rosmalen Open, Urszula lost in the quarterfinals to fourth seed and eventual finalist Kirsten Flipkens. Ranked 44 at the Wimbledon Championships, Urszula lost in the second round to American wildcard Alison Riske.

Urszula began her US Open series by playing at the Silicon Valley Classic. She won her first two rounds comfortably over Christina McHale and Daniela Hantuchová. She lost in the quarterfinals to third seed and eventual champion Dominika Cibulková. The week after Stanford, Urszula stayed in California and competed at the Southern California Open. She beat qualifier Marina Erakovic and sixth seed Jelena Janković in her first two rounds. She was defeated in the quarterfinals by top seed and eventual finalist Victoria Azarenka. Urszula suffered a first-round loss at the Rogers Cup to Flavia Pennetta. As the top seed for qualifying at the Western & Southern Open, she was defeated in the first round of qualifying by Petra Martić. Ranked 38t at the US Open, she lost in the second round to 15th seed Sloane Stephens.

Seeded fifth at the Guangzhou International Open, Urszula was defeated in the first round by Vesna Dolonc. In Tokyo at the Pan Pacific Open, she lost in the first round to 16th seed Dominika Cibulková. Urszula played her final tournament of the year at the China Open. She upset 16th seed Simona Halep in her first-round match. She lost in the second round to Maria Kirilenko.

Urszula ended the year ranked 43.

2014: Shoulder injury and fall from top 200

Urszula pulled out of the Australian Open due to a shoulder injury.

Urszula began her 2014 season in February when she played at the Dow Classic in Midland. As the top seed, she defeated Sachia Vickery and Kateřina Siniaková in her first two rounds. Her run ended as she lost in the quarterfinals to sixth seed Sharon Fichman. At the Abierto Mexicano Telcel, Urszula was defeated in the first round by top seed and eventual champion Dominika Cibulková. After Acapulco, Urszula competed at Indian Wells where she lost her first-round match to Aleksandra Wozniak. The following week, Urszula took part in the Miami Open where she was defeated in the first round by Nadia Petrova. The week after Miami, Urszula played at the Monterrey Open. She lost in the first round to second seed and eventual champion Ana Ivanovic. During the Fed Cup tie versus Spain, Urszula lost both of her rubbers to María Teresa Torró Flor and Silvia Soler Espinosa. Despite her losses, Poland was still able to win the tie 3–2.

Urszula began her clay-court preparation for the French Open at the Marrakesh Grand Prix. She was defeated in the first round by qualifier Lara Arruabarrena. At the Portugal Open, Urszula lost in the first round to Yanina Wickmayer. At the Madrid Open, Urszula was defeated in the first round of qualifying by Laura Pous Tió. At the Italian Open, Urszula lost in the final round of qualifying to Belinda Bencic. Ranked 79 at the French Open, she retired during her first-round match against Magdaléna Rybáriková.

Starting her grass-court season at the Birmingham Classic, Urszula was defeated in the first round by 16th seed Casey Dellacqua. In 's-Hertogenbosch, Urszula lost in the final round of qualifying to Mona Barthel. At the Wimbledon Championships, Urszula was defeated in her first-round match by ninth seed Angelique Kerber.

2015: New coach and getting back to form
Urszula started the season with the hiring of her new coach, Maciej Domka, a former tennis player. She reached three WTA quarterfinals at Auckland Open, Monterrey Open and İstanbul Cup. In July, she took out the last seed standing, Tsvetana Pironkova, to reach her first WTA semifinal in almost three years at the İstanbul Cup. She defeated Magdaléna Rybáriková for a place in the final. The final match effectively hinged on a tight first set in which Radwańska held three set points on the Lesia Tsurenko serve at 5–4. It was a disappointing outcome for Radwańska, who was also defeated on her only previous appearance in a WTA Tour final, in Rosmalen three years ago.
In August, Urszula participated in the US Open, but fell to Magda Linette in the first round and ended the season ranked No. 95.

2016: Ankle injury and fall from top 200
Urszula began her season at the Australian Open where she lost to Ana Konjuh in three sets. She continued at Taiwan Open, where she defeated Hsu Ching-wen but lost to Venus Williams in the second round. Next, Urszula qualified for the Mexican Open main draw where she faced Anastasia Pavlyuchenkova. However, she was forced to retire during the match with an ankle injury.

Urszula returned to the ITF Circuit in July, when she reached the quarterfinal at the Stockton Challenger tournament in California. She continued at the Stanford Classic, where she defeated Kateryna Bondarenko but lost to Dominika Cibulková in the second round.

She ended the year with a ranking of world No. 261.

2017: Fall from top 500
Urszula ended the year with a ranking of No. 524.

Business career
In addition to her tennis career, Urszula is also a businesswoman, and created and now owns the UR brand of luxury handbags.

Performance timelines

Singles 
Current through the 2022 Australian Open.

Doubles

WTA career finals

Singles: 2 (2 runner-ups)

Doubles: 1 (1 title)

ITF Circuit finals

Singles: 18 (7 titles, 11 runner–ups)

Doubles: 15 (10 titles, 5 runner–ups)

Junior Grand Slam tournament finals

Singles: 2 (1 title, 1 runner–up)

Doubles: 4 (3 titles, 1 runner–up)

ITF Junior Circuit finals

Singles: 10 (5 titles, 5 runner-ups)

Doubles: 17 (16–1)

Record against top players

Head-to-head vs. top-10 ranked players
Players who have been ranked world No. 1 are in boldface

  Francesca Schiavone 3–0
  Ana Ivanovic 2–2
  Daniela Hantuchová 4–2
  Marion Bartoli 1–0
  Anna Chakvetadze 1–0
  Jelena Dokić 1–0
  Martina Hingis 1–0
  Jelena Janković 2–0
  Svetlana Kuznetsova 1–1
  Flavia Pennetta 1–0
  Agnieszka Radwańska 1–3
  Victoria Azarenka 0–1
  Kimiko Date-Krumm 0–1
  Sara Errani 0–1
  Angelique Kerber 0–1
  Petra Kvitová 0–1
  Li Na 0–1
  Anastasia Myskina 0–1
  Nadia Petrova 0–1
  Patty Schnyder 0–1
  Ai Sugiyama 0–1
  Venus Williams  1–2
  Maria Sharapova 0–2
  Caroline Wozniacki 0–4
  Serena Williams 0–5

Wins over top 10s per season

Notes

References

External links

 
 
 
 Urszula Radwańska – Warsaw Open 2009
  

1990 births
Living people
People from Ahaus
Sportspeople from Münster (region)
Sportspeople from Kraków
Polish expatriate sportspeople in Germany
Polish female tennis players
Wimbledon junior champions
French Open junior champions
US Open (tennis) junior champions
Tennis players at the 2012 Summer Olympics
Olympic tennis players of Poland
Grand Slam (tennis) champions in girls' singles
Grand Slam (tennis) champions in girls' doubles
21st-century Polish women